Raja, (also known as The King of the Dark Chamber in the English translation), is a play by Rabindranath Tagore written in 1910. This play is marked as a symbolic play as well as a ‘mystic play’.  The story is loosely borrowed from the Buddhist story of King Kush from Mahāvastu. A short stage version of Raja was published under the title of Arupratan in 1920.

The theme of the play is ‘the secret dealing of God with the human heart.

Reception 
Sukumar Sen described Raja as ‘the first really symbolic drama by Tagore.’ 

The play became one of philosopher Ludwig Wittgenstein's favourite books, who found in it an expression of his own religious ideal.

References

External links

1910 plays
Plays by Rabindranath Tagore
Bengali-language plays